Michel Bohiri is an Ivorian actor. He was one of the main actors in the long-running television series Ma Famille (My Family). He became known throughout Africa for his work on the series. He left the show in 2007 to work with 225 Studios.

Filmography
 Guests surprised (2008)
 Article 15 Bis
 Ma famille
 Les Oiseaux du ciel (2006)
 Danger Permanent
Le Choix de Marianne
 Marco et Clara
 Mon père a pris ma femme
 Pardon ! je t'aime
 Amour & Trahison
Une famille sans scrupules
L'Escroc
Les Dragueurs

References

External links

21st-century Ivorian male actors
Living people
Year of birth missing (living people)